Harbor Drive can refer to:
Harbor Drive, a street in Portland Oregon
Harbour Drive, a proposed freeway in Halifax, of which the Cogswell Interchange is the only portion built
Harbor Drive, a boulevard and surface street in San Diego, California